The Journal of Materials Science: Materials in Electronics is a peer-reviewed scientific journal published by Springer Science+Business Media. It is an offshoot of the Journal of Materials Science, focusing specifically on  materials used in electronics. The editor-in-chief is Safa Kasap (University of Saskatchewan, Canada).

History 
This journal was originally published quarterly by Chapman & Hall from May 1990. This frequency was changed to six issues per year from 1994 to 1998, and then nine issues per year from 1999 to 2000. From 2001, the journal has been published monthly.

Abstracting and indexing 
The journal is abstracted andindexed in:

According to the Journal Citation Reports, the journal has a 2020 impact factor of 2.478.

See also 
 Advanced Functional Materials
 ECS Digital Library
 Journal of Electroceramics
 Journal of Electronic Materials
 Metamaterials (journal)

References

External links 
 

English-language journals
Engineering journals
Materials science journals
Springer Science+Business Media academic journals
Publications established in 1990
Monthly journals
Electronics journals